Stuart Wilson may refer to:

Stuart Wilson (actor) (born 1946), English actor
Stuart Wilson (footballer) (born 1977), English football midfielder
Stuart Wilson (archaeologist) (born 1979), English archaeologist
Stuart Wilson (Big Brother) (born 1984), contestant in Big Brother UK
Stuart Wilson (golfer) (born 1977), Scottish golfer
Stuart Wilson (sound engineer), Scottish sound engineer
Stuart Wilson (rower), lightweight rower who has competed for Great Britain and Australia
Stuart Wilson (musician), musician from the Cayman Islands

See also
Stu Wilson (born 1954), former New Zealand rugby union player
Stu Wilson (American football) (1907–1963), American football player
Stewart Wilson (born 1942), Scottish rugby union player
Stewart Murray Wilson (born 1947), New Zealand sexual offender